HMS Blonde was a 32-gun fifth-rate warship of the British Royal Navy captured from the French in 1760. The ship wrecked on Blonde Rock with American prisoners on board. An American privateer captain, Daniel Adams, rescued the American prisoners and let the British go free. The captain's decision created an international stir. Upon returning to Boston, the American privateer was banished for letting go the British crew and he and his family became Loyalist refugees in Nova Scotia.

Career
In the subsequent Battle of Bishops Court, the British captured Maréchal de Belleisle (after Thurot was killed), and Blonde. The Royal Navy took the latter two into service. It was named for its figurehead, in the form of a "large and shapely female in extreme décolletage," whose hair was painted blonde.

She participated in the Battle off Liverpool, Nova Scotia, 24 April 1778. 
On 30 May 1778 she captured Massachusetts privateer brigantine Washington south of Cape Sable Island. In 1779, Blonde, under the command of Andrew Barkley from Halifax Station, captured the Resolution, under the command of Abel Gore, off Halifax, and the crew were imprisoned there. She participated in the Penobscot Expedition of 1779, capturing, with HMS Virginia, the privateer "Hampden".

The troops, together with 80 marines, temporarily occupied Wilmington, North Carolina, on 28 January. The object of the expedition was to establish sea communications with Lord Cornwallis and provide a base for the army, which was moving north.

Fate
Blonde was wrecked on Blonde Rock, Nova Scotia on 21 January 1782.  The 60 American prisoners on board HMS Blonde made their way to Seal Island, Nova Scotia. American privateer Noah Stoddard in the Scammell reluctantly allowed the British crew to go free and return to Halifax in HMS Observer, which was involved in the Naval battle off Halifax en route.

Legacy 
 Namesake of Blonde Rock, Nova Scotia

See also

References 

1755 ships
Fifth-rate frigates of the Royal Navy
Maritime incidents in 1782
Transport in Nova Scotia
Nova Scotia in the American Revolution